Andrew Rona (born July 1971) is an American film producer and movie executive. The most popular of his films include Non-Stop, Project X, Equilibrium, Scream and Scary Movie.

Early life and education
Rona was born in New York. He studied film at the School of Visual Arts in New York City.

Career

Miramax Films (1991-1995) 

In 1991, while a student, Rona went to work as an intern for Harvey Weinstein at Miramax Films. Rona went on to become an assistant for the Weinsteins. He was then promoted in 1995 to Director of Development and Production for the new genre label "Dimension Films".

Dimension Films (1995-2006)

Rona served as Co-President of Dimension Films from 2001-2006, during which time the company changed its focus from acquiring and co-financing lower budget pictures to producing, marketing and distributing a wider variety of films. Rona supervised more than 60 productions, ranging from thrillers like the Scream franchise, to comedies like the Scary Movie franchise and Bad Santa, and to action films such as Sin City.

Project Greenlight 

In 2005 Rona appeared on Season 3 of the reality show Project Greenlight on Bravo.

Rogue Pictures (2005-2008)

In 2005, Rona joined Universal Pictures as co-president of the new label, Rogue Pictures, which was funded by Universal. Rona oversaw all creative aspects of the label. Under Rona's leadership Rogue Picture produced Shaun of the Dead, Hot Fuzz, The Strangers, Dave Chappelle's Block Party and Fighting.

Academy Member 

In 2008 Rona was invited to become a member of the Executive Branch of the Academy Motion Pictures Arts and Sciences.

Silver Pictures (2008-2014)

Rona served as President, Silver Pictures, Joel Silver's production company based at Warner Bros. studios from December, 2008 until January 15, 2014. He was responsible for overseeing all creative aspects of the company including production and development of feature films and television. Rona also produced several other productions including Non-Stop, Sherlock Holmes, and Project X. Rona also produced The Gunman. Rona left Silver Pictures in January, 2014.

The Picture Company (2015-Present)

In 2015 Rona started his own production company with Alex Heineman, The Picture Company, with financing from European conglomerate StudioCanal. He produced the first film under The Picture Company shingle, The Commuter, starring Liam Neeson, and Alpha, directed by Albert Hughes at Studio 8.

References 

Living people
1971 births
People from New York (state)
School of Visual Arts alumni
American film producers